The Office of the First Lady (OFL) is the staff accountable to the first lady of the United States. The office and its responsibilities, while not constitutionally mandated, have grown as the role of the first lady has grown and formalized through the history of the United States. The Office of the First Lady is an entity of the White House Office, part of the Executive Office of the President. It is located in the East Wing.

History
Though the persona, activities, and initiatives of the first lady have always been significant to the history of the United States, the first first lady to hire federally funded staff was Edith Roosevelt, who hired Belle Hagner as the first White House social secretary on October 2, 1901. Eleanor Roosevelt became the first first lady to expand the office beyond social and administrative secretaries by hiring Malvina Thompson as her personal secretary and Jackie Kennedy was the first to employ a press secretary.

Under Rosalynn Carter, the first lady's staff became known as the Office of the First Lady. She organized the office into four major departments: projects and community liaison, press and research, schedule and advance, and social and personal; and was the first to add a chief of staff. She was also the first to move her own work office into the East Wing. Though the role of the office has grown over the years, it primarily supports the first lady in promoting the agenda and campaigns of the president. Further to that, it provides support for the agenda of the first lady, who chooses causes and initiatives to campaign for during their time at the White House.

Organization

The first lady, Jill Biden, has her own staff. The information in the table below shows the key members of the current staff.

See also
 Bibliography of United States presidential spouses and first ladies

References

1977 establishments in the United States
Government agencies established in 1977
First Lady